Ryan Lynch (born 13 March 1987) is an English former professional association footballer.

Lynch began his club career with Coventry City as a trainee, but he found it difficult to break into the first team and so was sent out on loan to Tamworth where he made three appearances. Lynch was released by Coventry at the end of the 2006–07 season.

He then had a trial with Crewe Alexandra, after which Lynch signed a 1-year contract in July 2007. Despite this, Lynch only managed to make two league appearances for Crewe Alexandra. He was loaned out to Stafford Rangers and Altrincham during the second half of the 2007–08 season. After finishing his loan at Altrincham, Lynch was released by Crewe in May 2008.

External links

1987 births
Living people
English footballers
Association football defenders
Coventry City F.C. players
Tamworth F.C. players
Crewe Alexandra F.C. players
Stafford Rangers F.C. players
Altrincham F.C. players
English Football League players
National League (English football) players